is a Japanese pop singer. She is notable as one of the original member of pop girl group Dream along with Mai Matsumuro and Yu Hasebe. She is currently a soloist singer under TOKYO (W) REC(k)ORDS.

Career
Tachibana was originally one of the first three members of dream, chosen through a nationwide talent search held by Avex Trax in 2000. When lead singer Mai Matsumuro left the group, Tachibana was pronounced leader of the newly reformed eight-member group. She remained a member of the group throughout several major changes in members. In November 2010, Tachibana announced that she would be leaving Dream in 2011.

Discography
Kono Hito「この人」 (For Tokyo Purin) - 2004

Hikari「ヒカリ」 - 2015

Ano Hohoemi Wo「あの微笑みを」 - 2015

Collaborations
[2005.07.27] SLOW DANCE ORIGINAL SOUND TRACK (#6 Three Years, #10 Tachibana Kana, Mayu, natsu - One More Time, #15 Tachibana Kana, Mayu - Koi no Melody)

[2012.03.07] Shirota Yu - UNO (#7 Obstinacy feat. Kana Tachibana)

References

External links

1985 births
Living people
Dream (Japanese group)
Japanese dance musicians
Japanese female dancers
Japanese women pop singers
Japanese-language singers
People from Higashiōsaka
Musicians from Osaka Prefecture
21st-century Japanese women singers
21st-century Japanese singers